The Wollaston Theatre was a historic theater at 14 Beale Street in Quincy, Massachusetts.

It was built in 1926 and added to the National Register of Historic Places in 1989. In recent decades, the "Wolly" was a second-run discount movie house run by Arthur and Yvonne Chandler.

The theater closed in 2003.  After many plans to purchase and renovate it, following Arthur Chandler's death, the theater was finally sold to Miao Kun “Michael” Fang, the owner of the C-Mart supermarket chain.  

Demolition of the theatre began in June, 2016, and was completed over the next few months.  The site is now a parking lot.

The Wollaston Theatre was the venue for the last performance of the Plasmatics and Wendy O. Williams on their final tour in 1988.

See also
National Register of Historic Places listings in Quincy, Massachusetts

References

External links
The Wollaston Theatre at Cinema Treasures

Theatres on the National Register of Historic Places in Massachusetts
Neoclassical architecture in Massachusetts
Theatres completed in 1926
Buildings and structures in Quincy, Massachusetts
Theatres in Massachusetts
1926 establishments in Massachusetts
National Register of Historic Places in Quincy, Massachusetts